Twenty-Something Theatre is an independent theatre company in Vancouver, British Columbia, Canada, led by Artistic Director Sabrina Evertt.

Along with productions of works by playwrights, Twenty-Something Theatre holds an annual Spotlight production series that showcases one emerging Vancouver-area artist (rotating between actor, director, and playwright), and provides them with an opportunity to gain exposure. In 2010, the company developed and staged a workshop production of its first original play: Prodigals by Sean Minogue.

Theatre critic Colin Thomas wrote that "Twenty-Something Theatre performs an important function in Vancouver’s cultural ecology".

Chronology of Plays
2006
This is Our Youth by Kenneth Lonergan
2007
The Shape of Things by Neil Labute
2008
The Fever by Wallace Shawn
SubUrbia by Eric Bogosian
2009
Anne Frank is in My Dreams by Lee Cookson
Unidentified Remains and the True Nature of Love by Brad Fraser
2010
Prodigals (workshop production) by Sean Minogue
Blue Surge by Rebecca Gilman
2011
Nocturne by Adam Rapp
Prodigals by Sean Minogue
Tough! by George F. Walker
2012
The Bomb-itty of Errors by Jordan Allen-Dutton, Jason Catalano, Gretogy Qaiyum and Erik Weiner
2013
Us & Everything We Own by Sean Minogue

References

External links
 Twenty-Something Theatre Website

Theatre companies in British Columbia
Theatre in Vancouver